{|
{{Infobox ship image
|Ship image=Suffren-IMG 8647.jpg
|Ship caption=1/20th scale model of Suffren, lead ship of Duguesclins class, on display at the Musée national de la Marine
}}

|}

The Duguesclin''' was a 90-gun Ship of the line of the French Navy. She was the second ship in French service named in honour of Bertrand du Guesclin.

 Career Bayard was first used as barracks for prisoners sent to deportation to Îles du Salut, and then as a transport for those sent to the Bagne of Cayenne. She then took part in the Crimean War in the Black Sea in 1854 and 1855. On 6 July 1854, Duguesclin'' ran aground on the Warren Rock, off Cronstadt, Russia as the buoy marking it had been removed by the Russians. Her upper and middle deck guns had to be removed before she could be refloated.

In 14 December 1859, as she conducted trials of her newly installed steam engine under Commander Choux, she ran aground on Île Longue. All efforts to raise her proved fruitless and she was scrapped. Her engine was used on Jean Bart.

Notes, citations, and references

Notes

Citations

References

 90-guns ships-of-the-line

Ships of the line of the French Navy
Ships built in France
1848 ships
Crimean War naval ships of France
Suffren-class ships of the line
Maritime incidents in July 1854
Maritime incidents in December 1859